The Geopolitics of the Roman Empire deals with the "inalienable relationship between geography and politics of the Roman Empire". Once the Roman Empire had reached its natural borders, the location of potential threats to the empire and Roman troop locations played a major role in the elevation of Roman Emperors. Access to the troops, their location were crucial to the empire's internal politics, civil wars, and the eventual Fall of the Western Roman Empire.

Natural borders of the Roman Empire

The Empire established by Augustus stayed consistent in territory for most of its history, though grew to permanently add Britannia through the campaign of Claudius and Dacia through Trajan's campaigns. Augustus had previously wanted the empire to incorporate territory until the Elbe river but changed his plans after the Battle of the Teutoburg Forest. Trajan also conquered Mesopotamia in addition to Dacia, but the territory was abandoned by the next emperor, Hadrian, who felt the territory would be too difficult and expensive to maintain against the Parthian Empire. The Empire's boundaries, therefore, were Hadrian's Wall (sometimes the Antonine Wall), the Rhine and Main rivers in the Western Empire. The Danube River in the middle empire. The mountains of Armenia and deserts of Syria to the East and the Sahara Desert and Atlas Mountains in Africa.

However, after the Battle of Adrianople and Theodosius's subsequent peace deal with the Goths the Rhine and Danube frontiers became incredibly porous. As per the peace deal, the victorious Goths retained their rights to pledge allegiance to their own King and retain their weapons, becoming in effect a separate state within the borders of the Roman Empire. Finding it harder to penetrate into the Eastern Roman Empire past the Bosporus, the Goths turned west. The Vandals, Franks and Alans would soon join the Goths in settling in Western Roman lands, while retaining their tribal allegiances and heritage.

Fracturing of the Empire

The Empire fractured on many occasions, the first and most noteworthy being after the death of emperor Valerian, when the empire split into three parts; the Gallic Empire in the west, the Palmyrene Empire in the east and a rump middle empire led by Valerian's son, Gallienus. Conflict between the empires was initially averted as they were too busy dealing with external threats and a plague to fight amongst each other. However, the fracturing of the empire forced a reorganisation which allowed each part to hold back whatever threat they faced. The Gallic Empire stopped Frankish invasions, the rump Roman empire defeated an Alemanni force invading Italia, and Palmyra in the east under the stewardship of Odaenathus successfully fought off the Sassanid Empire. Modern historians credit this fracturing of the Empire as the reason that the Roman Empire endured under a period of intense duress, postulating that the three empires did a much better job than one Empire headed by a single emperor would have been able to do.

Indeed, the size of the empire and the inability for a single emperor to be able to effectively address barbarian invasions as well as internal threats of usurpation is one of the reasons Diocletian created the Tetrachy and the empire eventually split into its Eastern and Western halves.

The empire would continue to fracture during 407 AD, dissatisfied troops in Britannia hailed Constantine III as Emperor of the west. He then reached Gaul where he campaigned against a group of Vandals, Alans and Suebi who had crossed the Rhine.

Location of Roman capitals

During the Crisis of the Third Century, the presence of the emperor was required near the front to both subdue any barbarian invasion and to deter any possible usurpation or dissatisfaction from the troops. While the court moved with the emperor, during the height of the crisis the de facto capital moved to Mediolanum. The city rose as due to its proximity to the frontiers of both the Rhine and Danube rivers and as the base of an elite cavalry force (Comitatenses) founded by emperor Gallienus, which could quickly be mobilised to counter any such threat.

When Diocletian became emperor and formed the Tetrachy, the four cities of Nicomedia, Mediolanum, Sirmium and Trier became capitals of the Roman Empire. Trier due to its proximity to the Rhine frontier and ability to oversee the legionaries of the area, Sirmium was chosen for the same reasons on the Danube frontier. Diocletian chose Nicomedia as his capital due to its more central location between Europe and Asia and it became the Empire's most senior city.

When Constantine I became sole Emperor he built a new capital at Constantinople because of its site with easy access to the Danube and Euphrates frontiers able to meet the European barbarian and Sassanid threat respectively as well as its more defensible location than Nicomedia, surrounded as it was with water on three sides.

After the battle of Adrianople, the Rhine and Danube frontiers became incredibly porous and an independent horde of Goths were loose within the borders of the empire. Alaric I's siege of Milan in 403 was enough to persuade emperor Honorius to move the capital to a less exposed location and so Ravenna became capital of the Western Empire as it was surrounded by swamps on all sides and harder to lay siege to.

Troop locations
The Romans were a highly martial civilisation, troops were used to defend the empire from external threats as well as by commanders to stake a claim at being Emperor.

External threats

Barbarian tribes living across the Rhine and Danube Rivers would often enter Roman territory for raids, attracted by the idea of plunder. This naturally led to the stationing of large numbers of troops on these frontiers to act both as defense and a deterrent. Similarly, the Parthian Empire to the east, later replaced by the Sassanids posed a large threat to Roman Syria and Egypt. Egypt was of particular importance to the empire due to its grain supply, so the Romans also left a large garrison in the east to counter this threat. The island of Britannia also had a large troop garrison to ensure the pacification of the many tribes inside and outside Roman territory.

Internal threats
After the Marian reforms, the structure and culture of the Roman army had changed incredibly with legionaries loyalties siding more with their generals than the government of Rome. This trend continued through successive emperors and reached its zenith during the crisis of the third century, when the support of legionaries was the crucial factor of a potential emperor's successful bid for power and longevity of reign.

With this in mind, the most powerful individuals in the Empire after the Emperor himself were usually those in command of areas with large troop garrisons, or access to these areas. Historically these areas were the Danube frontier, the Rhine, the far east of the empire and Britannia.

Notes: (1) Table excludes c. 4,000 officers (centurions and above). (2) Auxiliary cavalry nos. assumes 70% of cohortes were equitatae

Analysis
The table shows the importance of auxiliary troops in the 2nd century, when they outnumbered legionaries by 1.5 to 1.
The table shows that legions did not have a standard complement of auxiliary regiments and that there was no fixed ratio of auxiliary regiments to legions in each province. The ratio varied from six regiments per legion in Cappadocia to 40 per legion in Mauretania.
Overall, cavalry represented about 20% (including the small contingents of legionary cavalry) of the total army effectives. But there were variations: in Mauretania the cavalry proportion was 28%.
The figures show the massive deployments in Britannia and Dacia. Together, these two provinces account for 27% of the total auxilia corps.

List of commanders declared Emperor by their legions 
Below is a list of Roman commanders who rose through the ranks of their respective legions to either rule the Empire, or form smaller breakaway empires.

List of commanders declared Emperor by the British legions

Britannia accounted for an eighth of the Roman Army at its height but the island was isolated from the continent, although there were significant troops on the island, the chances of a claimant emperor were small unless they could get the support of the Rhine legions too. Finally, neglected by the empire and unable to campaign and win plunder, dissatisfaction lead to troops in Britannia joining the barbarian plundering of the island they were meant to protect during the Great Conspiracy as well as a series of usurpers culminating in the declaration of Constantine III as Augustus in 407 AD.

 Clodius Albinus 193 AD, 196 AD
 Carausius 286 AD, ruler of Britain for seven years during the Carausian Revolt
 Constantine I  306 AD, founder of the Constantinian dynasty
 Marcus 407 AD
 Gratian 407 AD
 Constantine III 407 AD, removed the legionaries from Britannia to fight in Gaul.

List of commanders declared Emperor by the Rhine legions

The Rhine Legions were a formidable force, usually battle hardened and still close enough to Rome to exert influence.
 Vitellius 69 AD
 Valerian 253 AD
 Postumus 260 AD, founder of the Gallic empire
 Julian 355 AD

List of Commanders declared Emperor by the Eastern Legions

The Eastern Legions, although numerous found themselves far from Rome and therefore harder to exert influence on the politics of Rome
 Vespasian 69 AD, founder of the Flavian dynasty
 Pescennius Niger 193 AD
 Macrianus Major 259 AD
 Macrianus Minor 260 AD
 Vaballathus 267 AD, Ruler of the Palmyrene Empire
 Jovian 363 AD

List of Commanders declared Emperor by the Danube legions

The Danube Legions were the most powerful legionary force, they were the most numerous out of all the frontier forces, were usually battle hardened and could rely on their proximity to Rome to enable their candidate's succession.

 Septimius Severus 193 AD, founder of the Severan dynasty
 Maximinus Thrax 235 AD
 Decius 249 AD
 Trebonianus Gallus 251 AD
 Aemilianus 253 AD
 Ingenuus 260 AD
 Regalianus 260 AD
 Probus 276 AD

List of Commanders Who declared Emperor by the Comitatenses
The emperor Gallienus founded an elite cavalry force designed to quickly react to both internal (usurpations) and external (barbarian invasions) he based them in Milan and it was through them that the city gained stature and became de facto capital. Thus their status and location made them an incredibly powerful branch of the Roman military.
 Aureolus 268 AD
 Claudius Gothicus 268 AD
 Aurelian 270 AD, restorer of a unified Roman empire after conquering the Gallic Empire and Palmyrene Empire
 Diocletian 284 AD, founder of the tetrachy

Additional factors

Grain supplies

Throughout the Roman Empire the provinces of North Africa and Egypt were crucial to the Empire for their grain supply. Emperors would use a grain dole to win the support of the people of Rome and so control over these provinces were crucial. Augustus regarded Egypt with such importance that he made it a personal province to the Roman emperor, stationed legionaries under his direct command and made it law that any senator or general wishing to enter the province would first need the permission of the Emperor himself. Tacitus informs us that in 68 AD the governor of Africa, Clodius Macer was executed by Galba for threatening to cut the grain supply to Italy. [Ref: THE ROMAN EMPIRE AND THE GRAIN FLEETS: CONTRACTING OUT PUBLIC SERVICES IN ANTIQUITY BY MICHAEL CHARLES AND NEAL RYAN Queensland University of Technology]

Queen Zenobia's conquest of Egypt in 270 AD was a key reason that Aurelian marched on the Palmyrene Empire in 272 AD.

When the Empire split, North Africa was crucial to the Western Empire and Egypt to the Eastern for the same reasons. A defection of the governor of Africa, Gildo to the Eastern Roman Empire lead to war and Gothic King Alaric I who sacked Rome in 410 died while leading a campaign into Africa to cut the then Western Empire's grain supply. Similarly, in 408 AD a delay in the grain supply from Egypt to Constantinople lead to riots. And the Bishops of Alexandria, who held sway over the seaman's union of the port would use the leverage of grain supply to threaten Eastern Roman Emperors from time to time.[Ref: Paul Johnson A History of Christianity].

Mineral deposits
Hadrian had considered abandoning Trajan's conquest of Dacia, as he felt the salient was too difficult to defend but the presence of gold and silver mines in the region made its conquest lucrative. The depletion of the mines and its difficulty to defend was a major reason that emperor Aurelian abandoned the province in 275 AD, bringing the frontier back to the Danube river.

Britannia was also conquered in part due to its gold, silver and tin deposits but its island remoteness was a major reason for isolation during the Great Conspiracy and Carausian Revolt, its neglect and eventual withdrawal by Roman emperors.

References

Ancient Roman geography
Geopolitics
Government of the Roman Empire
History of the Roman Empire